Unusable (German: Unsühnbar) is a 1917 German silent drama film directed by Georg Jacoby and starring Adele Sandrock and Grete Diercks.

It was shot at the Tempelhof Studios in Berlin.

Cast
Adele Sandrock as die Mutter
Toni Zimmerer as ihr Sohn
Johannes Müller as ihr Sohn
Grete Diercks

References

External links

Films of the German Empire
German silent feature films
Films directed by Georg Jacoby
German war drama films
1917 drama films
Films shot at Tempelhof Studios
German black-and-white films
Films set on the German home front during World War I
1910s war drama films
Silent war drama films
1910s German films
1910s German-language films